Twelve men's teams and eight women's teams qualified for Water polo at the 2008 Summer Olympics.

Men 

^Berlin is the host of the super-final only.

Women 

Olympic
Qualification for the 2008 Summer Olympics
Q